This is list of tourist places in Dehradun a city in Uttarakhand state of India

Forest Research Institute (India)
Mindrolling Monastery
Tapkeshwar Temple
Kipling Trail
Khalanga War Memorial
Robber's Cave, India
Asan Barrage
Dehradun canals
Mahasu Devta Temple
Guru Ram Rai Darbar Sahib
George Everest's House
Sahastradhara
Lachhiwala

Gallery

References

 
T
D